Midwest Collegiate Hockey Association was a college athletic conference which operated in the midwestern United States. It participated in the NCAA's Division III as a hockey-only conference.  The conference included only men's teams.

History
The league was founded in 1998 with six teams: Benedictine University, the University of Findlay, Lawrence University, Marian University, the Milwaukee School of Engineering, and Northland College. After one year in the conference, Benedictine dropped hockey, and Findlay moved to the Division I College Hockey America conference.  The University of Minnesota Crookston joined in 1999.  As a Division II school, Minnesota Crookston operated the hockey team with no scholarships like the other Division III members of the league. While they competed in the conference championship, they were ineligible for the NCAA Division III Tournament, but they were eligible for the Harris Cup. 

In 2007, in order to meet NCAA guidelines and receive an automatic bid for the Division III tournament, the NCHA mandated that all member programs be Division III by the end of the 2008–09 season. Minnesota–Crookston continued to play in the conference for the next two years but after the '09 season the university dropped varsity hockey and were replaced by Lake Forest.

Finlandia University joined the conference for the 2004–05 season. Before the 2007–08 season, the MCHA added Concordia University in Mequon, Wisconsin, and Adrian College in Adrian, Michigan.

In the summer of 2012, the five hockey-playing schools in the University of Wisconsin System announced that they would leave the Northern Collegiate Hockey Association (NCHA) to begin playing hockey in their all-sports conference, the Wisconsin Intercollegiate Athletic Conference.  The move would have left only two men's teams in the NCHA, leading St. Norbert College and the College of St. Scholastica to join the MCHA.  In April 2013, the NCHA and MCHA announced a merger, where the NCHA would absorb the MCHA's teams (of the MCHA's 10 schools, all seven who also sponsored women's hockey played in the NCHA).  The men's and women's sides will retain separate administrative structures, as well as their automatic bids to the NCAA Tournament.

Members

Champions

MCHA regular season champions
1998–99: Findlay
1999–2000: UM–Crookston
2000–01: UM–Crookston
2002–03: UM–Crookston
2001–02: Marian
2003–04: Marian
2004–05: MSOE
2005–06: MSOE
2006–07: MSOE
2007–08: Adrian
2008–09: Adrian
2009–10: Adrian
2010–11: Adrian
2011–12: Adrian
2012–13: Adrian

Harris Cup Champions (playoffs)
2002: Marian
2003: UM–Crookston
2004: UM–Crookston
2005: MSOE
2006: MSOE
2007: Finlandia
2008: Adrian
2009: Adrian
2010: Adrian
2011: Adrian
2012: MSOE
2013: Adrian

NCAA Tournament Results
2010 Adrian
First Round vs. St. Norbert College L 3–4
2011 Adrian
Quarterfinals vs. Elmira College W 5–3
Semifinals vs. Oswego State University W 5–3
Championship vs. St. Norbert College L 3–4
2012 MSOE
First Round vs. Gustavus Adolphus College L 1–3
2013 Adrian
Quarterfinals vs. Oswego State University L 2-3 (OT)

References

External links
Official web site
MCHA Page on U.S. College Hockey Online